A raccoon coat is a full-length fur coat made of raccoon pelts, which became a fashion fad in the United States during the 1920s. Such coats were particularly popular with male college students in the middle and later years of the decade.

Purportedly they became popular due to the stories of Davy Crockett and popular artist James Van Der Zee. George Olsen and His Music released a recording highlighting the fad in 1928, titled "Doin' the Raccoon", with the lyrics:

From every college campus comes the cheer: oy-yoy!
The season for the raccoon coat is here, my boy!
Rough guys, tough guys, men of dignity,
Join the raccoon coat fraternity, soon,
To do the raccoon!

A few months after Olsen's recording hit the air, the November 16, 1929, issue of The Saturday Evening Post featured an Alan Foster illustration of several college men wearing raccoon coats. The raccoon coat (many times accompanied with a straw boater, wingtip spectator oxfords, and either a saxophone or a ukulele) has been referenced numerous times in movies and television, both as a symbol of the Jazz Age and as a cliché motif of collegiate enthusiasm.

The fad saw a resurgence during the mid-1950s, specifically vintage coats from the 1920s.

See also

References

External links
 Christian Chensvold's Ivy Style: "Class of '16: Great-Grandpa's Raccoon Coat," January 2, 2010.
 Google Image Search: Raccoon Coat
 "Doin' the Raccoon" George Olsen & His Music at YouTube.com
 "Doin' the Raccoon" - Lyrics - George Olsen & His Music

1920s fashion
Coats (clothing)